The Confederation of Professional Employees ( TCO , literary White-collar workers' Central Organisation) is a national trade union centre, the umbrella organisation for 13 trade unions in Sweden that organise professional and other qualified employees in both the private and the public sectors. The affiliated trade unions represent about 1.1 million employees. In 2018, the TCO affiliated unions made up 37% of all active trade union members in Sweden (up from 17% in 1950), making the confederation the second largest of Sweden's three major confederations. The largest TCO affiliate is Unionen with 551,000 active members in 2018. TCO is independent and not affiliated to any political party in Sweden. TCO is an affiliate of the European Trade Union Confederation and Eurocadres.

History
TCO is the product of two confederations that merged in 1944. The older organisation was the Confederation of Employees ( or DACO) founded in 1931 by seven private sector white collar unions representing 20,000 workers. The second organisation was the Swedish Confederation of Professional Employees ( TCO) which was founded in January 1937 by eight public sector unions representing 38,000 workers. The two confederations merged in 1944, adopting the name TCO, bringing together 40 trade unions representing 180,000. After World War II membership in the affiliated unions grew rapidly to more than half a million by 1965.

Affiliates and membership
Union density in Sweden has been at one of the highest levels in the world, peaking around 85% in the mid-1980s, but since declining to around 70% in 2015. In general, the decline in union density in Sweden has been faster among blue-collar workers and slower among white-collar workers (TCO's base of membership). Between 1990 and 2015, the rate of unionisation of white-collar workers fell from 80.5% to 72%, but for blue-collar workers, the fall was from 82% to 63%.

The Forest and Agricultural Service Union merged with Unionen on 1 June 2019.

TCO Certified
TCO owns the non-profit organisation TCO Development. TCO Development owns and develops the international sustainability certification TCO Certified. TCO Certified is a sustainability certification for IT products in offices and data centers worldwide. TCO Certified is available for office IT products: displays, notebooks, tablets, smartphones, desktops, all-in-one PCs, projectors, headsets, and data center products: network equipment, data storage products and servers. Certified products must meet comprehensive environmental and social criteria throughout the life cycle. For instance, factories where certified products are made must follow criteria on working hours, working environment and wages. Products must meet criteria for energy efficiency, ergonomic design and limited hazardous substance content.

See also

Swedish Federation of Salaried Employees in Industry and Services (PTK)
Swedish Public Employees' Negotiation Council (OFR)
Swedish Confederation of Professional Associations (SACO)
Swedish Trade Union Confederation (LO'')

Footnotes

External links
TCO product labeling.
TCO's Eva Nordmark:Unions must be relevant to our time

 
Labour movement in Sweden
International Trade Union Confederation
European Trade Union Confederation
Council of Nordic Trade Unions
1931 establishments in Sweden
Trade unions established in 1931